Abdul Alim (27 July 1931 – 5 September 1974) was a Bangladeshi folk singer. He won the Bangladesh National Film Award for Best Male Playback Singer in 1975 for playback in Sujan Sakhi. He was posthumously awarded the Ekushey Padak in 1977 and Independence Day Award in 1997 by the Government of Bangladesh.

Career
Alim migrated from Murshidabad to Dhaka after the partition of India in 1947, and joined the Dhaka Radio Station as a staff artiste. By the age of 14, he had recorded two songs. In Dhaka, he took lessons from Mumtaz Ali Khan and Mohammed Hossain Khosru. He got his breakthrough while performing songs at the Alia Madrasah in Calcutta. He was awarded five gold medals for his performances and contributions to music at the All Pakistan music conference in Lahore.

Alim recorded over 300 Gramophone records. He sang playbacks in over 100 films. He recorded songs for Mukh O Mukhosh, the first film to be produced in the erstwhile East Pakistan.

Works
Notable songs
"Nobi Mor Poroshmoni"
"Premer Mora Jole Dube Na"
 Chirodin Pushlam Ak Achin Pakhi
 Ei Je Duniya Kishero Lagia
 Shorbonasha Padma Nodi
 Holudia Pakhi Shonar Boron
 Naiya Rey Nayer Badaam Tuila
 Duarey Aishachey Palki
 Amare Shajay Dio Nowshar Shajey
 Porer Jaiga Porer Jomi
 Mon-e Boro Asha Chhilo Jabo Modina-e
 Shab Shakhire Par Korite Nebo Ana Ana
 Ujaan Gang-er Naiyya

Awards
 Bangladesh National Film Award for Best Male Playback Singer (1975)
 Ekushey Padak (1977)
 Independence Day Award (1997)
 President's Pride of Performance Award (1960) by the President of Pakistan
 Bachsas Awards (1972-1973)

Personal life And Legacy
Alim Has Three Sons

Jahir Alim , Azgar Alim , Haider Alim.

And Four Daughters

Akhter Jahan Alim , Asia Alim , Nurjahan Alim , Zohora Alim Nupur.

 Alim died on 5 September 1974, at PG Hospital in Dhaka, Bangladesh.

His Wife Begum Jamila Khatun  (as known as Jamila Alim) died on 13 October 2020 , at Yamagata Hospital in Dhaka, Bangladesh.

A research-based book on Alim's life, titled Bangla Loko Sangeet-er Amar Kanthoshilpi Abdul Alim along with a DVD, titled Tomaro Lagiarey, were launched in 2015.

References

External links
 

1931 births
1974 deaths
People from Murshidabad district
Bangladeshi male musicians
Best Male Playback Singer National Film Award (Bangladesh) winners
Recipients of the Ekushey Padak in arts
Recipients of the Independence Day Award
Singers from West Bengal
20th-century Indian male singers
20th-century Indian singers
Bangladeshi folk singers
Bangladeshi people of Indian descent